Gustavo Mauricio Quezada Reinoso (born 6 April 1997) is an Ecuadorian footballer who plays as a midfielder for Spanish club Marbella FC.

Club career
Born in Guayaquil, Quezada joined Getafe CF's youth setup in 2007, aged ten. On 14 February 2015, while still a junior, he made his senior debut with the reserves by coming on as a substitute in a 0–1 Segunda División B home loss against CD Tudelano; it was his maiden appearance of the campaign.

Quezada was definitely promoted to the B-team in June 2015, appearing more regularly afterwards. On 17 December 2016 he made his first team debut, replacing Álvaro Jiménez in a 3–1 home win against Real Valladolid in the Segunda División championship.

On 11 July 2018, free agent Quezada signed a two-year deal with CD Lugo, being assigned to the farm team in Tercera División. Roughly one year later, he moved to third division side Recreativo de Huelva on loan for the season.

On 20 August 2020, Quezada agreed to a one-year contract with Marbella FC in the third tier.

References

External links

1997 births
Living people
Sportspeople from Guayaquil
Ecuadorian footballers
Spanish footballers
Association football midfielders
Segunda División players
Segunda División B players
Tercera División players
Getafe CF B players
Getafe CF footballers
Polvorín FC players
Recreativo de Huelva players
Marbella FC players